Erbil Stones and Gems Museum is a small museum located within the Citadel of Erbil, at the heart of the city of Erbil (Hawler), the capital of Iraqi Kurdistan. The museum was founded (and is owned) by Sarbast Majeed. Majeed, a graduate of Mosul College of Sciences, Department of Geology in 1985, had gathered his 40-year collection of gemstones from many parts of the world and displayed it originally in a house in the small city of Shaqlawa (northeast of Hawler) in 2014. In 2016, the museum was relocated to the Citadel of Erbil and now occupies one of the traditional 2-story renovated buildings. The museum displays a multitude of common and rare stones and gems from within Iraq and many other countries as well as meteorite fragments and fossils and a variety of other items; the first and only of its kind in the Republic of Iraq and its Kurdistan Region. There is a shop on the 1st (upper) floor that sells genuine stones as well as replicas. The museum's entry is 1500 Iraqi Dinars (approximately $1.0). No-flash photography is allowed but photography of any kind within the shop is prohibited.

Gallery

See also
 Turkmen Heritage House

External links
 The museum's official page on Facebook
 The museum's official page on Instagram

Notes
 More images of the museum can be found on Wikimedia Commons

References

Museums in Erbil